Prairie City is a city in Grant County, Oregon, United States. The population was 909 at the 2010 census. The community was incorporated by the Oregon Legislative Assembly on February 23, 1891.

History
Prairie City grew out of the former mining camp of Dixie, established in 1862 about  up Dixie Creek from the John Day River. Prairie City, at the mouth of the creek, was chosen after placer mining rendered Dixie unsuitable for a townsite. The new city's post office was established in 1870 with Jules Le Bret as postmaster.

A narrow gauge line, the Sumpter Valley Railway (SVR), ran  from Baker City west to Sumpter and on to its western terminus at Prairie City, which it reached in 1907. It carried passengers as well as freight shipped by ranchers, mining interests, and timber companies until its piecemeal abandonment in the 1930s. In the 21st century, a heritage railway operates on a segment of the original line between Sumpter and McEwen.

Geography
Prairie City is in eastern Oregon at the upper end of the John Day River valley. Strawberry Mountain in the Strawberry Mountain Wilderness of the Malheur National Forest is directly south of the city.

Demographics

As of the census of 2010, there were 909 people, 402 households, and 257 families residing in the city. The racial makeup of the city was 94.6% White, 0.1% African American, 1.3% Native American, 0.1% Asian, 0.2% Pacific Islander, 0.3% from other races, and 3.3% from two or more races. Hispanic or Latino of any race were 3.1% of the population.

There were 402 households, of which 24.9% had children under the age of 18 living with them, 53.7% were married couples living together, 7.2% had a female householder with no husband present, 3.0% had a male householder with no wife present, and 36.1% were non-families. 32.1% of all households were made up of individuals, and 17% had someone living alone who was 65 years of age or older. The average household size was 2.18 and the average family size was 2.69.

 The median age in the city was 49.8 years. 20.4% of residents were under the age of 18; 5% were between the ages of 18 and 24; 18.9% were from 25 to 44; 30.2% were from 45 to 64; and 25.6% were 65 years of age or older. The gender makeup of the city was 49.3% male and 50.7% female.

At the census of 2000, the median income for a household in the city was $31,354, and the median income for a family was $35,893. Males had a median income of $31,771 versus $24,500 for females. The per capita income for the city was $16,278. About 10.6% of families and 14.7% of the population were below the poverty line, including 17.4% of those under age 18 and 9.4% of those age 65 or over.

Economy
The economy includes ranching, retail stores, a wood-fueled power plant, and public services. Prairie Wood Products, a mill that produces fine-grained studs from timber from nearby forests, is in Prairie City.

Education and culture

Prairie City School in Prairie City serves children from kindergarten through 12th grade.
 
Architectural features in Prairie City include historic stone buildings and the former railway depot. The ground floor of the depot consists of a waiting room, railway station agent's office, baggage room, and freight office. The second floor, once the home of the station agent and his family, houses the Dewitt Museum, with pioneer artifacts, tools, furniture, and memorabilia, as well as rocks and minerals from the surrounding area. The depot was listed on the National Register of Historic Places in 1976.

Bates State Park, built on the site of a former lumber mill, is northeast of Prairie City at Bates, near Austin Junction at the intersection of U.S. Route 26 and Oregon Route 7.

References

External links

 City of Prairie City
 Entry for Prairie City in the Oregon Blue Book
 Grant County Chamber of Commerce entry for Prairie City
 Weather statistics for Prairie City from The Weather Channel

Cities in Oregon
Cities in Grant County, Oregon
1862 establishments in Oregon
Populated places established in 1862